Aldama is one of the 67 municipalities of Chihuahua, in northern Mexico. The municipal seat lies at Juan Aldama.

As of 2010, the municipality had a total population of 22,302, up from 19,879 as of 2005.  It covers an area of 9835.9 km².

The municipality had 487 localities, the largest of which (with 2010 populations in parentheses) was: Juan Aldama (18,642), classified as urban, and classified as rural.

Geography

Towns and villages

References

Municipalities of Chihuahua (state)